The Charles Adams-Woodbury Locke House is an historic house in Somerville, Massachusetts.  The Greek Revival house was built about 1840 for a Boston leather merchant and was one of the first residences of a commuter, rather than a farmer, in the Winter Hill neighborhood of the city.  The house was listed on the National Register of Historic Places in 1989.

Description and history
The Adams House is located on the west side of Central Street, a short way south of Broadway, the major roadway that passes over Winter Hill.  It is a -story wood-frame structure, three bays wide, with a front-facing gable roof and clapboard siding.  The building has wide corner boards and a broad entablature, and the gable is fully pedimented.  A single-story porch extends across the front, supported by Doric columns, with a balustrade above.  The main entrance is in the right-most bay, flanked by sidelight windows.  The interior has retained much of its original woodwork.

Built about 1840, the house is a fine local example of Greek Revival architecture.  Its original parcel of land (now subdivided into residential plots), extended from Broadway to Medford Street.  Charles Adams was a farmer, state legislator, and one of the first tenants of Boston's Quincy Market.  Adams gave land for a schoolhouse on Broadway (now the site of the Winter Hill Congregational Church).  Woodbury Locke, a later resident, was involved in the leather business in Boston.

See also
National Register of Historic Places listings in Somerville, Massachusetts

References

Houses on the National Register of Historic Places in Somerville, Massachusetts
Houses completed in 1840
Greek Revival architecture in Massachusetts